The Hunter's Prayer is a 2017 action crime film directed by Jonathan Mostow, based on the 2004 novel For the Dogs by Kevin Wignall. The film tells about a conflicted hitman helping a young woman to avenge the death of her family. The film stars Sam Worthington, Odeya Rush, Allen Leech, and Amy Landecker. Filming began on August 12, 2014 in Yorkshire, England.

The film had its theatrical release on June 9, 2017 in the United States by Saban Films.

Plot
Lucas (Sam Worthington), a drug-addicted former soldier, is in a club looking for Ella Hatto (Odeya Rush). She is attending boarding school in Switzerland. Ella sees Lucas watching her and thinks he has been hired by her father to protect  her. Unbeknownst to Ella, her father was preparing to tell the FBI about Richard Addison's (Allen Leech) illegal operations and also stole 25 million dollars from him. Her father and step-mother have been murdered by a hired killer. Addison's gunmen try to kill Ella at the nightclub, but Lucas kills one and helps her escape. He receives a text threatening to kill his family if he doesn't kill Ella. He takes her across the French border.

Lucas calls Addison and he threatens to kill his estranged wife and daughter. Lucas tells Ella that her father was killed. At a grocery store, they are attacked by Addison's gunmen and Lucas gets shot in the leg. The two get on a train, where they meet Dani (Verónica Echegui), another contract killer. After treating Lucas's wounds, Dani makes Ella leave Lucas. Ella gets off the train, but Metzger (Martin Compston), an assassin who had killed Ella's father, tries to kill her. Lucas protects Ella. Dani, eager for the bounty, tries to kill Lucas, but she is killed by him. Lucas and Ella head to England. 

While Lucas recovers from drug addiction, Ella takes his gun and goes to Addison's office building, but she gets arrested by the police. Banks (Amy Landecker), an FBI agent working for Addison, takes Ella to Addison's house. At that time, Lucas is attacked by Dani and her colleague killer. He kills them and goes to Addison's house. In a final shootout, Lucas kills Banks and Addison shoots Metzger. As Addison is about to shoot Lucas, he is shot dead by Ella.

Ella receives a phone call from Lucas. Ella tells Lucas that she is now living with her aunt and cousins. The two say farewell to each other. Lucas visits a house, where his wife and daughter are waiting to welcome him.

Cast
 Sam Worthington as Stephen Lucas
 Odeya Rush as Ella Hatto
 Allen Leech as Richard Addison
 Amy Landecker as Gina Banks
 Martin Compston as Metzger
 Verónica Echegui as Dani
 Gabrielle Mostow as Jillian 
 Shayne Drummond as Teresa

Production
On January 30, 2013, it was announced that Sam Worthington would star lead as a hitman who helps a young girl to avenge the murder of her parents and brother, the film For the Dogs, based on Kevin Wignall's novel of same name, scripted by Paul Leyden and Oren Moverman was re-writing the script at that time. Phillip Noyce was set to direct the film, which Anthony Rhulen and Navid McIlhargey would produce through FilmEngine Entertainment, along with Worthington, John Schwarz and Michael Schwarz through their Full Clip Productions, with Leyden. On May 13, Hailee Steinfeld was added to the cast to play the young girl whose parents and brother are murdered. On November 8, the ensemble cast was announced which includes Martin Compston, Amy Landecker and Verónica Echegui. Sierra/Affinity announced that they had sold the film to twenty international buyers.

Filming 
Filming began in early November 2014 in Yorkshire, England (Leeds, Harrogate, Helmsley, Scarborough and Saltaire). It would also be shot in Switzerland, Germany, Spain, U.S. (New York City) and Hungary.

Release
In September 2016, Saban Films acquired distribution rights to the film. The film was released in the United States on June 9, 2017.

Reception
The Hunter's Prayer received poor reviews from critics. On Rotten Tomatoes, the film has an approval rating of 33% based on 21 reviews, and an average rating of 4.9/10. On Metacritic, which assigns a normalized rating, the film has a score 35 out of 100, based on 5 critics, indicating "unfavorable reviews".

Derek Smith of Slant Magazine gave the film 2.5 stars out of 4, writing, "The Hunter's Prayer is steadfastly concise and efficient, foregrounding action above expositional groundwork." Joe Leydon of Variety wrote, "Director Jonathan Mostow (Terminator 3) provides enough hairbreadth escapes, extended shootouts, crash-and-dash auto chases, and hand-to-hand combat sequences to make the movie modestly diverting for undemanding audiences." Justin Lowe of The Hollywood Reporter said, "The action falters a bit when attention shifts to the rocky relationship between Lucas and Ella, but cinematographer Jose David Montero and editor Ken Blackwell succeed in getting things back on track with a consistent succession of energetic chase and fight scenes."

References

External links
 
 Interview with author Kevin Wignall

2017 films
2017 action thriller films
American action thriller films
German action thriller films
Spanish action thriller films
English-language German films
English-language Spanish films
Films about assassinations
Films about drugs
Films set in Westchester County, New York
Films set in Switzerland
Films set in France
Films set in Leeds
Scarborough, North Yorkshire
Films shot in England
Films shot in Switzerland
Films shot in New York City
Films shot in North Yorkshire
Films shot in Germany
Films shot in Hungary
Films shot in Spain
Films directed by Jonathan Mostow
Films scored by Federico Jusid
Films with screenplays by Oren Moverman
2010s English-language films
2010s American films
2010s German films